Donia Samir Youssef Ghanem (born 1 January 1985) is an Egyptian actress and singer. She is the daughter of actor Samir Ghanem and actress Dalal Abdel Aziz; and sister of Amy (Amal). Donia graduated from MSA University and began her artistic life in 2001 when she was 16. She had her first role in a TV show called "Justice has many faces" ( – Lil Adala Wogouh Katheera).

Acting career 
Donia participated in two TV shows when she was a child. She attracted attention while acting in an Egyptian series called "Justice has many faces." Her first appearance in a film was in 2005 with the comedian Mohamed Henedi.

Through appearances in various Egyptian talk shows, Donia stood out for her mimicry of other Arab singers. Her most famous imitation was of Ahlam's voice singing Myriam Fares's song. Her first song was called "Far2 el Sen".

She was a judge on the 4th season (2015) of The X Factor Arabia along with Elissa and Ragheb Alama, both Lebanese singers.

Filmography

References

External links 

1985 births
Living people
Singers who perform in Egyptian Arabic
Singers from Cairo
Actresses from Cairo
Egyptian film actresses
Egyptian television actresses
Egyptian stage actresses
21st-century Egyptian women singers
21st-century Egyptian actresses